The 1898 South East Durham by-election was held on 3 February 1898 after the death of the incumbent Liberal Unionist MP, Sir Henry Marshman Havelock-Allan. The seat was gained by the Liberal candidate, Joseph Richardson, although the unsuccessful Liberal Unionist candidate Frederick William Lambton would regain the seat for the Liberal Unionists in the 1900 general election.

References 

Durham, South East
February 1898 events
1898 elections in the United Kingdom
1898 in England
19th century in County Durham